Petr Losman (born 31 October 1979) is a Czech orienteering competitor.

He won a bronze medal at the World Games in 2005 in the mixed relay, with Marta Štěrbová, Tomáš Dlabaja and Dana Brožková. His best achievements at the World Orienteering Championships are 7th in the sprint distance in 2003, and 10th in the sprint in 2005.

See also
 List of orienteers
 List of orienteering events

References

External links
 
 

1979 births
Living people
Czech orienteers
Male orienteers
Foot orienteers
World Games bronze medalists
Czech mountain runners
Competitors at the 2005 World Games
World Games medalists in orienteering